Duke of Hereford was a title in the Peerage of England. It was created in 1397 for Richard II's cousin, Henry Bolingbroke, due to his support for the King in his struggle against their uncle Thomas of Woodstock, 1st Duke of Gloucester. It merged in the crown on Henry's usurpation two years later, and has never since been recreated.

The title takes its name from Hereford, Herefordshire, England. The city lies near the border with Wales, and has more often been in the title of the Earl of Hereford or the Viscount Hereford.

Dukes of Hereford (1397)
also Duke of Lancaster (1399), Duke of Aquitaine (1399), Earl of Leicester (1265), Earl of Lancaster (1267), Earl of Derby (1337), Earl of Northampton (1384), Baron of Halton (c. 1070)
Henry Bolingbroke, 1st Duke of Hereford (1367–1413), eldest son of John of Gaunt, 1st Duke of Lancaster, himself third son of Edward III, took the throne as Henry IV in 1399 and this title merged with the crown

References

Extinct dukedoms in the Peerage of England
Peerages created for eldest sons of peers
Noble titles created in 1397
British and Irish peerages which merged in the Crown